The Pirate Party of Belgium is a political party in Belgium. Based on the model of the Swedish Pirate Party, it supports reform of copyright law, the abolition of patents, and respect for privacy.  It was a founding member of Pirate Parties International.

Electoral participation

2010 federal elections 
The party participated for the first time in the federal elections of 13 June 2010, but only for the electoral district of Brussels-Halle-Vilvoorde, where they received 0.26% of the votes. Their only candidate (apart from successors) was Jurgen Rateau.

2012 local elections

The party presented lists at municipal and provincial elections in Belgium in 2012, in 14 municipalities and 26 provincial districts. The provincial results were generally around 1% in Flanders and 3% in Walloon.

The best result they obtained was 3.42% in provincial district of Tournai by Paul Bossu and at the communal level, 5.16% at Louvain-la-Neuve, the list led by Lionel Dricot. The pirates at Ottigines list-Louvain-la-Neuve were only 14 votes short of a seat.

2014 federal and regional elections
In the federal election of 25 May 2014, the Pirate Party participated in the Flemish constituencies of Antwerp (0.98%), East Flanders (0.82%) and Limburg (0.71%) as well as the Walloon constituencies of Hainaut (0.80%) and Liège (0.63%).

In the simultaneous regional elections, the Pirate Party had candidates for the four major constituencies (i.e. not Limburg or Brussels) for the Flemish Parliament, and received 25,986 votes (0.62%) in total. For the Walloon Parliament, the party only competed in the constituency of Nivelles where they received 3,612 votes (1.54% in the constituency, 0.18% for the entire election). Their result was again strongest in Louvain-la-Neuve with 2.49% in that municipality. The Pirate Party also competed in the French language group for the Brussels Parliament, where they received 3,026 votes (0.74%).

2018 local elections
In the 2018 Belgian local elections, the Pirate Party presented a shared list with Volt Belgium under the name "Paars" ("Purple") in several municipalities, gaining 1,476 in Antwerp and less than one thousand in Brussels.

References

External links
 Official website

Belgium
Political parties in Belgium